Procecidochares alani is a species of tephritid or fruit flies in the genus Procecidochares.

Distribution
The species is native to Mexico. Specimens have been introduced to Hawaii, New Zealand, and Australia as a biocontrol agent against Ageratina riparia. Larve of P. alani feed on the inside of the invasive plant, and cause stem galls to form, impeding growth.

P. alani was first introduced to Australia in 1987 as a biocontrol agent, but had limited success as it was soon effected by native parasitoid wasps.

References

Insects described in 1974
Diptera of North America
alani
Insects used for control of invasive plants